Asperoseius is a genus of mites in the Phytoseiidae family.

Species
 Asperoseius africanus Chant, 1957
 Asperoseius australiensis Fain & Krantz, 1990
 Asperoseius baguioensis Corpuz-Raros, 1994
 Asperoseius henryae Fain & Krantz, 1990
 Asperoseius lagunensis Corpuz-Raros, 1994

References

Phytoseiidae